Dry hole may refer to:

 an oil well without significant amounts of oil (see also Hydrocarbon exploration)
 an unsuccessful business venture
 David Harold Byrd, nicknamed "Dry Hole", American businessman

See also 
 Dry-hole clause, in oil and gas contract law